Odeleite is a river located in the municipality of Castro Marim, Algarve, in Portugal. It originates in the mountains of the Serra do Caldeirao and flows through the municipalities Sao Bras de Alportel, Tavira, Alcoutim, Castro Marim in the district of Faro. Also, there is a water reservoir of the same name because of the dam created on the path of the river. Odeleite is a right tributary of the River Guadiana.

The river is also known as "The Blue Dragon River" because of its dark blue color and unusual curvy shape.

References

Rivers of the Algarve